The Vega class is a series of 4 container ships originally built for Nippon Yusen Kaisha (also known as NYK Line) and later operated by Ocean Network Express (ONE). The ships were built by Hyundai Heavy Industries in South Korea. The ships have a maximum theoretical capacity of around 9,012 twenty-foot equivalent units (TEU).

List of ships

See also 
NYK bird-class container ship

References 

Container ship classes
Ships built by Hyundai Heavy Industries Group